Lermoos is a municipality in the district of Reutte in the Austrian state of Tyrol.

It consists of two subdivisions: Unterdorf and Oberdorf.

Lermoos is most popular for its skiing and snowboarding in the winter and is very popular resort in the Zugspitze Arena. The town has many hotels. The village is set looking towards the Zugspitze (the highest mountain in Germany) and the Sonnenspitze. The town also has restaurants such as the Bauernstube, Jones Dorfstuberl, Cafe Franco, Cafe Sam and many more. There is good public transport to Lermoos and buses for skiers running around the resorts. There is also a train station (DB Regio) to connect to larger towns e.g. Garmisch Partenkirchen and Reutte. Mentions of Lermoos date as far back as 1073, but may be older do to the presence of an ancient Roman road, the Via Claudia.

References

External links 
 
 

Ammergau Alps
Cities and towns in Reutte District
Lechtal Alps